Enrique Guzmán (born February 1, 1943) is a Venezuelan-born Mexican singer and actor. He is one of the pioneers of Rock & Roll in Mexico, along with César Costa, Angélica María, Johnny Laboriel and Alberto Vasquez, among others. He is also the father of Mexican singer Alejandra Guzmán by his former wife, actress and singer Silvia Pinal.

Life and career
Enrique Guzmán was born in Venezuela to Mexican parents. They moved back to Mexico when Enrique was 7. He studied medicine at the Universidad Nacional Autónoma de México although he did not complete his studies.

Guzmán has been a rock star in Mexico throughout the last half of the 20th century, known primarily for his translation of 1950s rock standards, such as "Jailhouse Rock", for Spanish-speaking listeners. In 1958 he joined "Los Teen Tops", along with the Martínez brothers and piano player, Sergio Martel. In 1959 they debuted in the US on CBS radio, and they released their famous version of "La Plaga" (Good Golly Miss Molly). He also wrote several hits for himself "Pensaba en tí", "La Ronchita", and for other Latin stars. 

He also appeared in films, such as Canta Mi Corazón in 1965. His hits include Spanish covers of "Put Your Head on My Shoulder", "Rolly Polly", "Bonnie Moronie" as well as the original "Dame Felicidad" ("Give Me Joy"). During the mid-1960s Guzmán formed a motion picture company and produced some films in Ecuador.  In the late 1960s, Guzman and his wife, Silvia Pinal, starred in a television show called Silvia y Enrique. He has continued recording, including with his daughter Alejandra Guzmán, throughout the 1990s and 2000s.  As with his ex-wife and his daughter, he has his handprints embedded onto the Paseo de las Luminarias; he was inducted in 1983 for his work in the recording industry.

Family life
His first wife was Mexican actress Silvia Pinal. Singer Alejandra Guzmán and musician Luis Enrique Guzmán are their children. He is currently married to Rosalba Welter Portes Gil, niece of actress Linda Christian and granddaughter of former Mexican president Emilio Portes Gil. They have  two children together, Daniela and Jorge Guzmán. Daniela has participated in theater and musicals.

References

External links

1943 births
Living people
La Academia judges
Male actors from Caracas
Mexican male film actors
Mexican male singers
Mexican male telenovela actors
Mexican television presenters
Mexico in the OTI Festival
Naturalized citizens of Mexico
Singers from Caracas
Venezuelan emigrants to Mexico
Venezuelan people of Mexican descent